Amitabha Singh is a cinematographer and producer in the Indian film industry who is known for Khosla Ka Ghosla, National Award-winning Chillar Party, etc. He started his career as a cinematographer in 1994. The Good Road a 2013 Indian (Gujarati) film produced for NFDC by Amitabha Singh fetched numerous accolades and was screened at various international film festivals. It has also been nominated as India's official entry in the Best Foreign Language Film category at the 86th Academy Awards. He was also the Director of Photography for the film. The film won the award for Best Gujarati film at the 60th National Film Awards. The film is the first Gujarati film ever selected to represent India at the Oscars.

Life and career
Amitabha Singh graduated from the Film and Television Institute of India (FTII) in 1994. Prior to that he has completed his Bachelor’s in Computer Science and Master’s in Mathematics from Delhi University and Banaras Hindu University respectively. Moreover, he did a  Japanese Degree course at Jawaharlal Nehru University (JNU). In the year 2016, Amitabha started an innovative social endeavour called 'Cinevidya'. Under this initiative, he is conducting country-wide Children's Film Festivals and Workshops so that more and more Children could get sensitized about the role of Audio-Visual Media for Community Development and Creative Expression.

"Cinema for Life" is the motto at Cinevidya through which he is putting all efforts in making Filmmaking tools and techniques relevant for today's youth, especially in the sphere of Value Education, Life Skills and Creative Expressions. Cinevidya brings the Art, Science and Skill of Filmmaking- that is Digital Media and Content Creation, at the doorstep of every individual who is inclined to learn about the magical medium of Films. Cinevidya is truly a last mile, ground level enterprise which believes in engaging with students in a completely experiential space. Working tirelessly since 2014 it has reached out to more than 50 institutions spread across India and equipped close to 5000 children with fundamental skills of content ideation and creation using the Audio Visual medium. They have also been entrusted to set-up and facilitate a model Media Lab at many Schools and conduct Teacher's Training sessions for some Institutions.

'Panchayat' is one of the most popular web television series of 2020 that chronicles the life of an engineering graduate who joins as a Panchayat secretary in a fictional remote village Phulera of Uttar Pradesh due to lack of better job options. Amitabha is the Director of Photography on this series, bringing his inventive genius once again to bring this unique comedy-drama alive on screen.

Amongst many of industry initiatives, Amitabha has been a pioneer in bringing Super16 in the professional realm with his 'Think16', pushing the underlying thought of generating a cross-platform awareness about Super 16 in the Indian film-making environment. He made the format undergo numerous tests and challenges that professional visual standards demanded and applied it for varied projects including Feature Films, Advertising Films, Short Films, Student Films etc. which in turn gave a fresh boost to the independent film making activities in India.

Ad films
Amitabha Singh has been actively shooting Ad Films since 1995 and has worked on many commercial advertising assignments for leading Indian products.

Selected filmography

As Cinematographer

As Producer

Sau Jhooth Ek Sach - 2003
The Good Road - 2013
Shortcut Safari - 2016

As Director

Shortcut Safari - 2016

References

External links

Hindi film cinematographers
Hindi film producers
Living people
Delhi University alumni
Banaras Hindu University alumni
Jawaharlal Nehru University alumni
Film and Television Institute of India alumni
Year of birth missing (living people)